Teri Steer-Cantwell (born October 30, 1975, in Crete, Nebraska) is an American shot putter.

In 1999, she won bronze medals at the World Indoor Championships and the Pan American Games, and finished ninth at the World Championships. She attended Southern Methodist University (SMU) in Dallas, Texas.

She is married to shot putter Christian Cantwell. She hails from Crete, Nebraska and currently resides in Columbia, Missouri.

On May 27, 2008, she gave birth to her first son, Jackson Daniel Cantwell, 11-pounds 2-ounces.

International competitions

References

 
USATF profile

1975 births
Living people
People from Crete, Nebraska
Track and field athletes from Nebraska
American female shot putters
Olympic track and field athletes of the United States
Athletes (track and field) at the 2000 Summer Olympics
Pan American Games track and field athletes for the United States
Pan American Games medalists in athletics (track and field)
World Athletics Championships athletes for the United States
Athletes (track and field) at the 1999 Pan American Games
Southern Methodist University alumni
Pan American Games bronze medalists for the United States
Competitors at the 1998 Goodwill Games
Medalists at the 1999 Pan American Games
21st-century American women